Judge Pollak or Pollack may refer to:

Cheryl Pollak (judge) (born 1953), magistrate judge of the United States District Court for the Eastern District of New York
Louis H. Pollak (1922–2012), judge of the United States District Court for the Eastern District of Pennsylvania
Milton Pollack (1906–2004), judge of the United States District Court for the Southern District of New York

See also
John Calvin Pollock (1857–1937), judge of the United States District Court for the District of Kansas
Justice Pollock (disambiguation)